Manoj Kumar is an Indian film director, producer and television actor who has directed Tamil, Telugu and Kannada films and Tamil serials. He is the brother-in-law of Bharathiraja.

Career 
After assisting Bharathiraja in various films, he made his directorial debut with Mannukkul Vairam (1986). He directed several films in 1990s such as, Guru Paarvai (1998) starring Prakash Raj, won positive reviews. He attempted to collaborate again with Prakash Raj and Prabhu in a film titled Vasantha Kaalam, but the project was stalled. He then went on to make medium budget action films including Vaanavil (2000) and Jaisurya (2004) featuring Arjun, as well as Raajjiyam which had Vijayakanth and Dileep in the lead cast.

He ventured into production in the mid 2000s and made the Madhavan - starrer Arya, before launching a directorial project titled Utharavu with Seeman, which eventually did not progress. Manoj Kumar resurfaced in 2013, when it was revealed that he was working with producer Kovai Thambi on a venture titled Uyirukku Uyiraga. The script of the film was reported to be about the relationship between parents and their grown-up children, while the cast was composed of newcomers.

He is also into acting both in Tamil cinema and Tamil serials as character artist most notably in Thirumanam (TV series) from Colours (TV channel) tamil. He also appears in a negative role in Rasathi serial from Sun TV (India).

Filmography

As director 
Films

Serials

As producer 
I Love You Daa (2003)
Arya (2007)

As actor 
Films

Serials

References

External links 
 

Living people
Indian film directors
Tamil film directors
Telugu film directors
1960 births
Kannada film directors
20th-century Indian film directors
21st-century Indian film directors
People from Theni district
Film directors from Tamil Nadu
Tamil film producers
Film producers from Tamil Nadu
Male actors from Tamil Nadu
Indian male film actors